Ranko Despotović (born 21 January 1983) is a Serbian former professional footballer who played as a forward.

Club career
Born in Loznica, Serbia, Socialist Federal Republic of Yugoslavia, Despotović made his professional debuts with local FK Loznica aged only 17, and proceeded to score almost 30 goals overall in his first three years, subsequently being acquired by FK Vojvodina.

After parts of seasons loaned to lowly FK Mačva Šabac, he returned, having a stellar 2006–07 season and helping the team to the third place in the league and coming up second in the domestic cup; to help achieve this, he topped the nation's goal charts by netting 17 times.

In January 2008, Despotović signed with FC Rapid București in Romania, and continued abroad for the ensuing summer as he joined Spain's Real Murcia for three years and €1.5 million. He was brought to the club by head coach Javier Clemente, who became aware of the player while coaching the national team of Serbia.

For the 2009–10 campaign, Despotović stayed in the country and its second division, moving on a season-long loan to UD Salamanca. The following year, still in that level, he led Girona FC with 18 goals (seventh-best in the competition) as the Catalans finished comfortably in mid-table.

On 1 July 2011, Despotović signed for Japan's Urawa Red Diamonds. In late 2013, following an unsuccessful trial at former club Girona, he moved to Sydney FC, after being convinced to join by former Vojvodina teammate Nikola Petković. He made his debut for his new team against Wellington Phoenix FC, coming on as a substitute and scoring the 2–1 winner in injury time.

Despotović returned to Spain on 7 July 2014, joining second-level side Deportivo Alavés. He subsequently competed in the country's lower leagues, with Cádiz CF and Marbella FC.

International career
Despotović made his debut for Serbia in a UEFA Euro 2008 qualifier against Kazakhstan, a 1–0 home success on 24 November 2007.

Career statistics

References

External links

Early career stats; at Srbijafudbal 

1983 births
Living people
Sportspeople from Loznica
Serbian footballers
Association football forwards
Serbian SuperLiga players
FK Loznica players
FK Vojvodina players
FK Mačva Šabac players
Liga I players
FC Rapid București players
Segunda División players
Segunda División B players
Real Murcia players
UD Salamanca players
Girona FC players
Deportivo Alavés players
Cádiz CF players
Marbella FC players
J1 League players
Urawa Red Diamonds players
A-League Men players
Sydney FC players
Serbia international footballers
Serbian expatriate footballers
Serbian expatriate sportspeople in Romania
Expatriate footballers in Romania
Serbian expatriate sportspeople in Spain
Expatriate footballers in Spain
Serbian expatriate sportspeople in Japan
Expatriate footballers in Japan
Serbian expatriate sportspeople in Australia
Expatriate soccer players in Australia